Canberra Olympic FC is an Australian semi-professional Association football club based in the suburb of O'Connor in the north of Canberra, Australian Capital Territory. The club was founded in 1956, and currently competes in the National Premier Leagues Capital Football.

History
Olympic was founded in the early 1950s by the local Greek community of Canberra. Formally the name Olympic was decided in a General Meeting of players and committee members in 1956 with the alternative name AEK losing out in the vote.

Olympic have won the ACT top division league (premiership) on seven occasions under the names Canberra Olympic, Olympic and Downer Olympic. The most recent title was the NPL Capital Football premiership in 2017.

In addition to this, Olympic have won six grand finals (championship). The most recent being 2016 NPL Capital Football Grand Final, defeating Canberra FC 3-0 at Deakin Stadium in front of 2,782 people.

In 1980, as Downer Olympic, the club won their closest premiership ahead of Croatia Deakin (now Canberra FC) by one goal. After 21 games both clubs finished on 32 points and had scored 53 goals with Olympic claiming the title on the back of their superior defence with the side conceding only 16 goals compared to Deakin's 17.

Canberra Olympic have succeeded in winning the premiership and championship 'double' three times in the club's history in 1993 1994 and 2016. In 1993, Olympic won the premiership by three points ahead of Southern Cross while they beat the same opposition in the grand final on penalties 8-7. In 1994, Olympic finished first in the league ahead of Tuggeranong United while they beat Tuggers in the grand final 3-1.

In 2016, Canberra Olympic won the premiership by three points ahead of Cooma FC, while they beat Canberra FC 3-0 in the Grand Final.

On 18 June 2016, Canberra Olympic qualified for their first FFA Cup with a 3-1 victory over Cooma FC in the 2016 ACT Federation Cup final, played at Deakin Stadium.

Canberra Olympic advanced to the 2016 FFA Cup semi finals as the last remaining NPL club in the cup that year, before being defeated by A-League side Sydney FC 3-0 at Viking Park in front of a ground record 5,581 crowd. On the way to the semi finals Olympic advanced past Surfers Paradise Apollo SC 1-0 (round 32), Redlands United FC 2-0 (round 16) and Green Gully SC 1-0 (quarter finals) at Deakin Stadium.

In 2017, Canberra Olympic won the premiership by 11 points ahead of the FFA Centre of Excellence, only losing one game during the regular season.

In 2017, Canberra Olympic qualified for their second successive FFA Cup with victory over Tuggeranong FC in the 2017 ACT Federation Cup final, played at Deakin Stadium.

Canberra Olympic lost their 2017 FFA Cup Round of 32 play off to Sorrento FC in Perth 1-0.

Club identity

Colours and crest

Olympic's primary colours of blue and white reflect the club's Greek heritage as it shares the colours of the Greek national flag. Olympics alternative colours are red and white. The club's crest is a traditional shield of white with a blue trim encompassing the club's name, location and the Olympic torch and rings.

Club name

The club was founded as Olympic Soccer Club in 1956 by the local Greek community which settled in Canberra. in 1973 the club changed its name to Downer Olympic before changing it back to simply Olympic in 1991. Finally, in 1997 the club changed its name to Canberra Olympic, which it has retained as its name since that point.

Current squad

Coaching staff

All the Canberra Olympic NPL men's and women's team staff for the 2023 season.

Honours

ACT League Premiers and Finals Champions
Premiers (7): 1975, 1980, 1993, 1994, 2006, 2016, 2017
Champions (6): 1958, 1993, 1994, 1997, 2013, 2015, 2016
Capital Football Federation Cup
Winners (6): 1979, 1981, 1983, 1997, 1999, 2016, 2017

Season-by-season results

References

External links

 Official club website
 Current Squad
 Capital Football home
 NPL Capital Football home

Association football clubs established in 1955
National Premier Leagues clubs
Soccer clubs in Canberra
1955 establishments in Australia
Diaspora sports clubs in Australia